The Circuito Sur (CS), meaning "Southern Circuit", is a west-east highway connecting Artemisa to Sancti Spíritus, through the southern and coastal side of central-western Cuba. With a length of 491 km, it is the third-longest Cuban highway after the "Carretera Central" and the "Circuito Norte".

Route

Description
The CN starts in Artemisa, capital of the homonym province, and crosses the provinces of Mayabeque, Matanzas, Cienfuegos and Sancti Spíritus, ending in the city of Sancti Spíritus. The highway goes along the Caribbean Coast in some areas and both endpoints cross the Carretera Central.

Table
The table below shows the route of the Circuito Sur. Note: Provincial seats are shown in bold; the names shown under brackets in the section "Municipality" indicate the municipal seats.

See also

Roads in Cuba
Circuito Norte
Circuito Sur de Oriente

References

External links

Roads in Cuba
Artemisa Province
Mayabeque Province
Matanzas Province
Cienfuegos Province
Sancti Spíritus Province